The 2000 Stroud Council election took place on 4 May 2000 to elect members of Stroud District Council in Gloucestershire, England. One third of the council was up for election and the council stayed under no overall control.

After the election, the composition of the council was
Conservative 23
Labour 18
Liberal Democrat 6
Green 4
Independent 4

Background
Before the election the council was run by an alliance between the Labour Party and the Liberal Democrats.

Election result

Ward results

References

2000 English local elections
2000
2000s in Gloucestershire